Maloye Savino is a rural locality (a village) in Savinskoye Rural Settlement, Permsky District, Perm Krai, Russia. The population was 29 as of 2010. There are 3 streets.

Geography 
Maloye Savino is located 20 km southwest of Perm (the district's administrative centre) by road. Kichanovo is the nearest rural locality.

References 

Rural localities in Permsky District